Łukasz Szczoczarz (born 19 January 1984 in Rzeszów) is a Polish footballer who currently plays for Głogovia Głogów Małopolski.

Career
In the summer 2009, he moved to LKS Nieciecza.

References

External links
 

1984 births
Living people
MKS Cracovia (football) players
Polish footballers
People from Rzeszów
Bruk-Bet Termalica Nieciecza players
Sportspeople from Podkarpackie Voivodeship
Association football forwards
Stal Rzeszów players